Gloeocantharellus is a genus of fungi in the family Gomphaceae. It contains 12 species that are found in mainly tropical and subtropical regions.

Taxonomy 
The genus was circumscribed by American mycologist Rolf Singer in 1945.

Species 
 G. corneri - m Sri Lanka, Brazil and French Guiana
 G. dingleyae
 G. echinosporus - Malaysia, Indonesia, Solomon Islands and Melanesia
 G. lateritius - Sri Lanka
 G. mamorensis
 G. novae-zelandiae
 G. okapaensis -  New Guinea and Solomon Islands 
 G. pallidus
 G. persicinus
 G. purpurascens - SE United States, French Guiana
 G. salmonicolor - Panama
 G. uitotanus - Colombia

Distribution and habitat 
This species is mostly found in tropical and subtropical areas.

References 

Gomphaceae
Agaricomycetes genera
Taxa named by Rolf Singer